is a Super Famicom strategy video game about Europe during World War II.

The player can play as either Nazi Germany or the Allied forces. The game is mostly in Japanese, although ASCII letters can be used when typing in names. Once in the game mode, the X button is used to confirm orders. Each stage has its own individual background sound that provides additional tension to the atmosphere. Being the final game in the Koutetsu no Kishi trilogy, this game would be the sequel to Koutetsu no Kishi and Koutetsu no Kishi 2: Sabaku no Rommel Shougun.

Gameplay

General gameplay
There are three difficulty levels: easy, medium, and hard. There is also fuel and ammunition to consider when planning strategy for offense or defense. Once all combatant units are eliminated or once everyone runs out of ammo and/or fuel, the battle is resolved. The game can end in a draw, however, if fuel or ammunition runs out and there are still a decent amount of combat units on both sides of the conflict. The actual battle scenes play like a dice game with the player having the least amount of luck in two different rounds losing his units, similar to Risk.

There are different scenarios from 1939 to 1945; with all the major battles covered from the Nazi invasion of Poland (resulting a decisive victory for Nazi Germany) to the Battle of Berlin (which was a decisive victory for the Soviet forces in real life and resulted in Adolf Hitler's fateful death). A hidden 16th scenario appears after the player successfully finishes all 15 of the scenarios that the game originally provides.

Construction mode
This mode allows the player to take one of the scenarios and customize them. Using the construction mode, a battle can take place using the seasons of winter or summer, involve either one or two players, and players can even replace the units and the drivers that are involved in the battle. For example, Poland can have Soviet or German tanks for an equal confrontation with the Nazi forces in the battle for Poland during the month of September 1939.

See also
SNES Mouse
List of World War II video games

References

1995 video games
Asmik Ace Entertainment games
Japan-exclusive video games
Koutetsu no Kishi series
Super Nintendo Entertainment System games
Super Nintendo Entertainment System-only games
Top-down video games
Video game sequels
Video games developed in Japan
Video games scored by Akihiko Mori
War video games set in Europe
World War II video games
Multiplayer and single-player video games